The Distinguished Service Award of the Ministry of Foreign Affairs is civil award issued by the Turkish Ministry of Foreign Affairs.

The award consists of a gold medal set and a certificate signed by the Minister of Foreign Affairs. The legal basis of the award is the Ministry of Foreign Affairs' Directive No. 155 dating from 14 November 1989.

Criteria 
The award is given to locals and foreigners who have demonstrated exceptional success in explaining Turkey in the world stage, in the successful implementation of its foreign policy, in the protection and development of its interests, and in the promotion of its history, language, culture and art. The award is also given to those who have done admirable services in other matters falling within the scope of the Ministry's duties and responsibilities.

Nomination and approval procedures 
Nominations for the Distinguished Service Award are normally initiated by the Minister of Foreign Affairs. However, officials at deputy ministry or higher level who wish to recommend an individual or organization for this award may do so by submitting a memorandum of justification, cleared by the Director General, to the Ministry.

Recipients 
The following people and organizations have been awarded:

References

External links 

Distinguished Service Award Ministry of Foreign Affairs

Civil awards and decorations of Turkey
Awards established in 1989
Orders, decorations, and medals of Turkey
Distinguished service awards